João José Pereira da Costa (born 25 August 1992), known as Costinha, is a Portuguese professional footballer who plays for C.D. Santa Clara as an attacking midfielder.

Club career
Born in Coimbra, Costinha finished his youth career at local club Académica de Coimbra. His first season as a senior was split between amateurs Sertanense F.C. and U.D. Tocha.

In January 2014, after one and a half seasons in the Danish 1st Division with FC Fredericia, Costinha returned to his country's lower leagues after signing with Lusitano FCV. He moved straight to the Primeira Liga in summer 2015 after agreeing to a contract at Vitória de Setúbal, making his debut in the latter competition on 16 August in a 2–2 home draw against Boavista F.C. where he played the full 90 minutes and scoring his first goal the following weekend in the 4–0 away victory over Académica.

Costinha played 32 matches in both the 2016–17 and 2017–18 campaigns. He scored once and twice respectively, as his team managed to consecutively avoid relegation. 

On 15 January 2019, Costinha joined fellow league side G.D. Chaves on a two-and-a-half-year deal worth €170,000, as his link at the Estádio do Bonfim was about to expire. In his second appearance of a season that ended in relegation, he scored the only goal away to Portimonense SC. On 10 August, in the club's first game back in the second tier, he was sent off in a 3–0 loss at C.D. Nacional.

Costinha returned to the top flight at the start of 2020, on a three-year contract at C.D. Santa Clara. On 22 July the following year, he scored on his European debut as a late substitute at KF Shkupi, concluding a 3–0 away win in the second qualifying round of the UEFA Europa Conference League. He had an operation in August 2021 on his right Achilles tendon, and was not expected to return until March.

References

External links

1992 births
Living people
Sportspeople from Coimbra
Portuguese footballers
Association football midfielders
Primeira Liga players
Liga Portugal 2 players
Segunda Divisão players
Padroense F.C. players
Sertanense F.C. players
Lusitano FCV players
Vitória F.C. players
G.D. Chaves players
C.D. Santa Clara players
Danish 1st Division players
FC Fredericia players
Portuguese expatriate footballers
Expatriate men's footballers in Denmark
Portuguese expatriate sportspeople in Denmark